The 2018–19 UMass Lowell River Hawks women's basketball team will represent the University of Massachusetts Lowell during the 2018–19 NCAA Division I women's basketball season. The River Hawks are led by first year head coach Tom Garrick and will once again play most their home games in the Costello Athletic Center while select games will be played in the Tsongas Center at UMass Lowell and were members of the America East Conference. They finished the season 7–22, 3–13 in America East play to finish in a tie last place. Due to a tie breaker loss to New Hampshire and UMBC they failed to qualify for the America East women's tournament.

Media
All non-televised home games and conference road games streamed on either ESPN3 or AmericaEast.tv. Most road games streamed on the opponent's website.

Roster

Schedule

|-
!colspan=9 style=| Non-conference regular season

|-
!colspan=9 style=| America East regular Season

See also
 2018–19 UMass Lowell River Hawks men's basketball team

References

UMass Lowell River Hawks women's basketball seasons
UMass Lowell
UMass Lowell River Hawks women's basketball
UMass Lowell River Hawks women's basketball